The Cambodia–Philippines relations refers to the diplomatic relations between the Philippines and Cambodia. Relations were formally established in August 1957. The Philippines and Cambodia have maintained cordial ties since the resumption of diplomatic relations in 1995. Cambodia maintains an embassy in Manila and the Philippines also maintains an embassy in Phnom Penh.

Relations

Prior to European colonization, the people of the Cambodian civilization and the port-kingdoms of the Philippines had traded with each other for centuries. The trade was negated after Spain subjugated and took control of the Philippines in the 16th century. Before the Philippines was colonized, Portuguese explorers recorded that people from Luzon-Philippines called Lucoes participated in wars across Southeast Asia and were even soldier-mercenaries in the Burmese-Siamese wars between Thailand and Myanmar, who were fighting over who would invade Cambodia. 

Having witnessed the Lucoes ' involvement in the Burmese-Siamese Wars, in 1594, Cambodia sent an embassy in Manila, requesting military assistance against the invading Siam (now Thailand) from the rulers of Luzon (which had now changed hands from Native Filipinos to Spaniards). The embassy delegation, headed by Blas Ruiz and Diego Belloso, persuaded the Spanish governor general to the Philippines, Luis Perez Dasmarinas, to send an expedition to Cambodia to aid the king. The expedition consisted of one ship and two junks. It left the Philippines in 1596, carrying artillery and ammunition. After the invasion of Cambodia by Thailand in the Siamese-Cambodian War. The Spanish officers together with their Filipino and Mexican troops plus Portuguese and Japanese allies briefly restored the Christian Cambodian King Satha II who was in exile in Laos, back to the throne. However, after that, a reinvasion by the Thais supported by Chams and Malays killed King Satha II and the royal family was once again exiled.

There is record of commercial contact between Cambodia and Spanish Manila in the seventeenth century.  Cambodia was a source of boat building for Manila because of the excellent timber that came from the country's forests. 
When the French conquered Indochina and released the Kingdom of Cambodia from Thai domination as a protectorate of France, and restored the Cambodian royal family, Spanish-Filipinos were among the troops that were with the French in the conquest of Indochina.

Cambodia's King Norodom I once made a state visit to the Philippines and brought back home with him several Filipinos who have since served in the royal court.

Both countries have an agreements on economic and trade relations, agricultural and agribusiness collaboration, and tourism cooperation. Both countries have maintained cordial ties since the resumption of diplomatic relations. The Philippines and Cambodia will sign an agreement to combat transnational crime and terrorism.

The two countries have concluded agreements on economic and trade relations, agricultural and agribusiness collaboration, and tourism cooperation.

Although Cambodia is China's close ally, relations between the Philippines and Cambodia remain strong despite a rift in early 2012 over the Association of Southeast Asian Nations (ASEAN) failure to issue a joint statement on territorial disputes in the South China Sea, the Philippine ambassador in Phnom Penh said. Cambodian Ambassador to the Philippines Noe Wong, described the two countries relationship as "strong and excellent".

Cambodia recalled its previous Ambassador to the Philippines, Hos Sereythonh, following his accusation that the Philippines and Vietnam used "dirty politics" to push the other ASEAN members for a common stand on the South China Sea dispute. In 2016, Cambodia stopped an ASEAN unified stance using the case ruling that the Philippines won against China. Cambodia's stance on the issue may impact its own territorial disputes with Thailand since the significance of the Philippines' case against China is identical to the dispute of Cambodia with Thailand. By ruling in favor of China, Cambodia signaled that Thailand's occupation on its territories is also just.

Gallery

References

 
Philippines
Bilateral relations of the Philippines